is an extreme trans-Neptunian object and sednoid discovered by astronomers Scott Sheppard, David Tholen, and Chad Trujillo with the Subaru Telescope at Mauna Kea Observatory on 5 September 2021. It resides beyond the outer extent of the Kuiper belt on a distant and highly eccentric orbit detached from Neptune's gravitational influence, with a large perihelion distance of 55.5 astronomical units (AU). Its large orbital semi-major axis (~1,000 AU) suggests it is potentially from the inner Oort cloud. Like ,  lies in the  perihelion gap that separates the detached objects from the more distant sednoids; dynamical studies indicate that such objects in the inner edge this gap weakly experience "diffusion", or inward orbital migration due to minuscule perturbations by Neptune. 

's heliocentric distance was  when it was discovered. It has been detected in precovery observations by the Dark Energy Survey at Cerro Tololo Observatory from as early as July 2017. It last passed perihelion in the early 1990s and is now moving outbound from the Sun.

References

External links 
 
 

Minor planet object articles (unnumbered)

20210905